The Shire of Isisford was a local government area located in central western Queensland, between the towns of Longreach and Blackall.

The region formerly located within the shire contains many large cattle and sheep stations.

History 
The Shire of Isisford was created on 1 January 1908 under the Local Authorities Act 1902, having been separated from the Shire of Barcoo. On 15 March 2008, under the Local Government (Reform Implementation) Act 2007 passed by the Parliament of Queensland on 10 August 2007, the Shire of Isisford merged with the Shires of Ilfracombe and Longreach to form the Longreach Region.

Towns and localities 
The Shire of Isisford included the following settlements:

 Isisford
 Emmet
 Yaraka

Population

Chairmen
 1919: F. J. C. Coxon 
 1927: J. J. Dowie

References

Former local government areas of Queensland
2008 disestablishments in Australia
Populated places disestablished in 2008